The Saracen joust of Arezzo (Giostra del Saracino, Giostra ad burattum) is an ancient game of chivalry. It dates back to the Middle Ages.

It was born as an exercise for military training. This tournament was regularly held in Arezzo between the 16th century and the end of the 17th century, when memorable jousts in baroque style were organized. The game went on for the whole Modern Age, having an important social function within the urban community. The joust was indeed a great public event during the visit of important authorities (sovereigns, princes, etc.), or it was used to make certain civil feasts more solemn (e.g. carnivals and noble's weddings).

The joust – which became a typical tradition of Arezzo at the beginning of the 17th century – declined progressively during the 18th century and eventually disappeared, at least in its "noble" version. After a brief popular revival between the 18th and 19th century, the joust was interrupted after 1810 to reappear only in 1904 in the wake of the Middle Ages reappraisal operated by Romanticism. Finally, the joust was definitely restored in 1931 as a form of historical re-enactment set in the 14th century, and quickly acquired a competitive character.

Current joust 
The historical reenactment takes place every year in Arezzo on the next to last Saturday of June, by night (the so-called San Donato Joust, dedicated to the patron saint of the town) and on the first Sunday of September, in the afternoon (the September Joust).
The teams in the event are the four quarters of the town of Arezzo: 
 Porta Crucifera, known as Culcitrone (green and red),
 Porta del Foro, known as Porta San Lorentino (yellow and crimson),
 Porta Sant'Andrea (white and green) and
 Porta del Borgo, today called Porta Santo Spirito (yellow and blue).
The Saracen Joust is organized by the Municipality of Arezzo through a special institution whose governing body (the managing council) is chaired by the Mayor of Arezzo, but also includes the presidents (Rettori) of the four competing quarters.

The jousting day starts in the morning, when the town's Herald reads the proclamation of the joust challenge, and then continues with a colorful procession of 350 costume characters and 27 horses parading along the streets of Arezzo. The topic moment of the parade is the blessing of the men-at-arms, which takes place on the steps of the Duomo and is given by the Bishop of Arezzo.

The knights' tournament is held in the Piazza Grande, guided by the Maestro di Campo and preceded by the costume characters and the town's ancient banners entering the square accompanied by the sound of trumpets and drums. 
Some important moments can be defined at this stage of the event: the highest authorities of the Joust entering the square (the magistrates, the Jury, the quarters' presidents), the performance of flag-wavers, the jousters galloping into the racing field, each knight representing an ancient noble family of Arezzo, the knights' arrangement on the lizza (jousting track), the Herald reading the Challenge of Buratto (a poetic composition written in octaves in the 17th century), the crossbowmen and the soldiers greeting the crowd shouting "Arezzo!", the magistrates' authorization to run the joust and finally the Joust's musicians playing the Saracen Hymn, composed by Giuseppe Pietri (1886–1946).

Then, the real competition starts. The jousters of the four gates (the real protagonists of the event) gallop their horses with lance in rest against the Saracen, an armor-plated dummy representing a Saracen holding a cat-o'-nine-tails in his hand ("Buratto, King of the Indies"). The sequence of charges is drawn on the week preceding the joust during a costume ceremony in Piazza del Comune. It's almost impossible foreseeing what the result of the joust will be: it depends on the ability, the courage and the good-luck of the eight jousters who alternate on the packed-earth sloping track (the lizza) that runs transversally across Piazza Grande. The competition is won by the couple of knights who hit the Saracen’s shield obtaining the higher scores. The quarter associated to the winning knight receives the coveted golden lance. In the event of a draw between two or more quarters after the standard number of charges (two sets of charges for each jouster), the prize is assigned with one or more deciding charges. At the end of the joust, mortar shots hail the winning quarter.
	
The rules of the tournament are contained in technical regulations that repeat – virtually unchanged – the Chapters for the Buratto Joust dating back to 1677. They are easy to understand, and yet worded in such a way as to guarantee a long-lasting suspense. The outcome of the fight between the Christian knights and the "Infidel" is undecided until the very last moment due to dramatic turns of events. For instance, jousters may be disqualified if they ride accidentally off the jousting track, or their scores may be doubled if their lance breaks after violently hitting the Saracen.

Videogames 
On 15 June 2010, a free videogame about the Saracen Joust was released, in collaboration with Arezzo municipality and the Saracen Joust Institution.
Developed with Unity technology and accessible directly via a standard web browser through a dedicated website, the videogame allows the player to participate as a jouster of one of the four-quarters in a realistic reproduction of the tournament, inclusive of all the announcements spoken by the official Herald, Gianfrancesco Chiericoni.
Up to four players in multiplayer can participate online and rank in the global rankings.

On 14 August 2014, the videogame homepage was updated with a splash screen referring to an imminent new release of the game. The homepage shows a screenshot of the Herald making an announcement. At this moment, the original videogame is not accessible.

See also 

 Arezzo
 Jousting

Gallery

References

External links 
 Associazione Sbandieratori Arezzo
 Toscana Inside

Arezzo
Horse races in Italy
Historical competitions of Italy
Italian traditions